George Bancroft (September 30, 1882 – October 2, 1956) was an American 
film actor, whose career spanned seventeen years from 1925 to 1942. He was cast in many notable films alongside major film stars throughout his Hollywood years.

Early years

Bancroft was born in Philadelphia, Pennsylvania, in 1882. He attended Tomes Institute in Port Deposit, Maryland.

Maritime work
During his days in the Navy, he staged plays aboard ship.

In 1900, he swam underneath the hull of the battleship  to check the extent of the damage after it struck a rock off the coast of China. For this, he was appointed to the United States Naval Academy, but found it too restrictive for his tastes and left to pursue a theatrical career.

Acting career 
In 1901, Bancroft began acting in earnest, as he toured in plays and had juvenile leads in musical comedies. In vaudeville, he did blackface routines and impersonated celebrities. His Broadway credits include the musical comedies Cinders (1923) and The Rise of Rosie O'Reilly (1923).

One of his early films was The Journey's End (1921). Bancroft's first starring role was in The Pony Express (1925), and the next year he played an important supporting role in a cast including Wallace Beery, Charles Farrell and Esther Ralston in the period naval widescreen epic Old Ironsides (1926), then went from historical pictures to the gritty world of the underground in Paramount Pictures productions such as von Sternberg's Underworld (1927) and The Docks of New York (1928). He was nominated for the Academy Award for Best Actor in 1929 for Thunderbolt, played the title role in The Wolf of Wall Street (1929, released just prior to the Wall Street Crash), and appeared in Paramount's all-star revue Paramount on Parade (1930) and Rowland Brown's Blood Money (1933), condemned by the censors because they feared the film would "incite law-abiding citizens to crime." Bancroft had enjoyed his career height in silent pictures and none of his early sound films in which he played the lead had the same impact.

Reportedly, he refused to fall down on set after a prop revolver was fired at him, saying "Just one bullet can't stop Bancroft!". By 1934, he had slipped to being a supporting actor, although he still appeared in such classics as Mr. Deeds Goes to Town (1936) with Gary Cooper, Angels with Dirty Faces (1938) with James Cagney and Humphrey Bogart, Each Dawn I Die (1939) with Cagney and George Raft, and Stagecoach (1939) with John Wayne and Thomas Mitchell. In 1942, he left Hollywood to be a full-time rancher.

Personal life 
Bancroft first married actress Edna Brothers. Three years later, he married musical comedy star Octavia Broske. In 1934, Brothers sued him, claiming they had never divorced. Two years later, the case was settled, and Brothers obtained a divorce.

Death 
On October 2, 1956, Bancroft died in Santa Monica, California, at age 74. He was interred there in the Woodlawn Memorial Cemetery.

Complete filmography

 The Journey's End (1921) as The Ironworker
 The Prodigal Judge (1922) as Cavendish
 Driven (1923) as Lem Tolliver
 Teeth (1924) as Dan Angus
 The Deadwood Coach (1924) as Tex Wilson – in play
 Code of the West (1925) as Enoch Thurman
 The Rainbow Trail (1925) as Jake Willets
 The Pony Express (1925) as Jack Slade
 The Splendid Road (1925) as Buck Lockwell
 The Enchanted Hill (1926) as Ira Todd
 Sea Horses (1926) as Cochran
 The Runaway (1926) as Lesher Skidmore
 Old Ironsides (1926) as Gunner
 White Gold (1927) as Sam Randall
 Too Many Crooks (1927) as Bert the Boxman
 Underworld (1927) as 'Bull' Weed
 Tell It to Sweeney (1927) as Cannonball Casey
 The Rough Riders (1927) as Happy Joe
 The Showdown (1928) as Cardan
 The Drag Net (1928) as Two-Gun Nolan
 The Docks of New York (1928) as Bill Roberts
 The Wolf of Wall Street (1929) as The Wolf
 Thunderbolt (1929) as Thunderbolt Jim Lang
 The Mighty (1929) as Blake Greeson
 Paramount on Parade (1930) as Mug (Impulses)
 Ladies Love Brutes (1930) as Joe Forziati
 Derelict (1930) as Bill Rafferty
 Scandal Sheet (1931) as Mark Flint
 Rich Man's Folly (1931) as Brock Trumbull
 The World and the Flesh (1932) as Kylenko
 Lady and Gent (1932) as Stag Bailey
 Blood Money (1933) as Bill Bailey
 Elmer and Elsie (1934) as Elmer Beebe
 Hell-Ship Morgan (1936) as Captain Ira 'Hell-Ship' Morgan
 Mr. Deeds Goes to Town (1936) as MacWade
 Wedding Present (1936) as Pete Stagg
 A Doctor's Diary (1937) as Dr. Clem Driscoll
 John Meade's Woman (1937) as Tim Mathews
 Racketeers in Exile (1937) as William Waldo
 Submarine Patrol (1938) as Capt. Leeds
 Angels with Dirty Faces (1938) as Mac Keefer
 Stagecoach (1939) as Marshal Curley Wilcox
 Each Dawn I Die (1939) as John Armstrong
 Espionage Agent (1939) as Dudley Garrett
 Rulers of the Sea (1939) as Captain Oliver
 Green Hell (1940) as 'Tex' Morgan
 Young Tom Edison (1940) as Samuel 'Sam' Edison
 When the Daltons Rode (1940) as Caleb Winters
 Northwest Mounted Police (1940) as Jacques Corbeau
 Little Men (1940) as Major Burdle
 Texas (1941) as Windy Miller
 The Bugle Sounds (1942) as 'Russ' Russell
 Syncopation (1942) as Steve Porter
 Whistling in Dixie (1942) as Sheriff Claude Stagg (final film role)

Notes

References

External links

Photographs and literature

1882 births
1956 deaths
American male stage actors
American male film actors
Male actors from Philadelphia
20th-century American male actors
Burials at Woodlawn Memorial Cemetery, Santa Monica
Paramount Pictures contract players
United States Naval Academy alumni
 United States Navy sailors